Gonospira dupontiana is a species of air-breathing land snail, terrestrial pulmonate gastropod mollusks in the family Streptaxidae.

Description
The length of the shell attains 19 mm.

Distribution
This species is endemic to Mauritius and Rodriguez (in the Mascarenes)

References

 Crosse, H., 1873. Diagnoses Molluscorum novorum. Journal de Conchyliologie 21: 136-144
 Griffiths, O.L. & Florens, V.F.B. (2006). A field guide to the non-marine molluscs of the Mascarene Islands (Mauritius, Rodrigues and Réunion) and the northern dependencies of Mauritius. Bioculture Press: Mauritius. Pp. i–xv, 1–185.

External links
 Nevill, G. (1870). On the land shells of Bourbon, with descriptions of a few new species. The Journal of the Asiatic Society of Bengal, Part II, 39 (4): 403-416. Calcutta

Gonospira
Gastropods described in 1870
Taxonomy articles created by Polbot
Endemic fauna of Mauritius
Taxobox binomials not recognized by IUCN